WFFH (94.1 FM), WBOZ (104.9 FM), and WFFI (93.7 FM) are radio stations trimulcasting a Contemporary Christian radio format as "FM 94 The Fish."  WFFH is licensed to Smyrna, Tennessee, WBOZ to Woodbury and WFFI to Kingston Springs, with the stations serving the Nashville metropolitan area. All three stations simulcast in order to provide maximum coverage to Middle Tennessee.

The stations are owned by the Salem Media Group, the largest owner of Christian radio stations in the United States. Much like its sister stations in Los Angeles, Atlanta, Cleveland and other markets, the trimulcast use the branding "The Fish," an early symbol of the Christian Church.

History

WFFH History
WFFH was previously WRLG, then a sister station to WRLT, owned by Tuned In Broadcasting and airing a modern rock format. In early 1995, the station's format changed from "The Exxit" (a satellite format from the Major Networks) to The Underground Network (once called WDRE). Several months later, the station changed its format to active rock, branded as "Thunder 94". In October 1997, facing intense pressure from WKDF (which had flipped to modern rock some time before), Tuned In Broadcasting pulled the plug on "Thunder 94", and the format changed to AAA format and became "The Phoenix", playing a mix of rock and rap music. Shortly before the sale to its current owners, WRLG began simulcasting then-sister station WRLT.

WFFI History
WFFI was previously operated under the callsign WYYB, and was a simulcast of WRLG, which broadcast the active rock format under "Thunder 94", the AAA format under "The Phoenix", and was briefly a simulcast of WRLT. Prior to this, it was briefly the FM affiliate of WDKN, a community-oriented station in Dickson, Tennessee, to which it was originally licensed.

WBOZ History
WBOZ was assigned call sign WLMM on August 23, 1991. On June 1, 1994, the station changed its call sign to the current "WBOZ", and began broadcasting a Southern gospel format. WBOZ would broadcast the Southern gospel format from 1994 until July 2012, when the station began simulcasting sister station WFFH.

Previous logo of WBOZ

See also
List of Nashville media

References

External links
Station website

FFH
FFH
Radio stations established in 1985
Salem Media Group properties
1985 establishments in Tennessee